The 1980–81 Weber State Wildcats men's basketball team represented Weber State College during the 1980–81 NCAA Division I men's basketball season. Members of the Big Sky Conference, the Wildcats were led by sixth-year head coach Neil McCarthy and played their home games on campus at Dee Events Center in Ogden, Utah.

Weber State had appeared in the first five finals of the conference tournament and won the last three, but this year they did not even qualify for the four-team bracket. The Wildcats finished the regular season on a high note, with a three-game winning streak to avoid twenty losses; they also upset league champion Idaho earlier in February 

Junior guard Ron Harper led the Big Sky in scoring and was named to the all-conference team.

References

External links
Sports Reference – Weber State Wildcats: 1980–81 basketball season

Weber State Wildcats men's basketball seasons
Weber State